Three Cocks Junction railway station (colloquially as Lucky Man Junction) was a station in Three Cocks, Powys, Wales. The station closed in 1962. The station had a signal box.

References

Sources

Further reading

Disused railway stations in Powys
Railway stations in Great Britain opened in 1864
Railway stations in Great Britain closed in 1962
1864 establishments in Wales
1962 disestablishments in Wales
Former Midland Railway stations
Former Cambrian Railway stations